The Passage is an album by steelpan player Andy Narell that was released in 2004 and recorded with the group Calypsociation.

Track listing
All tracks are composed by Andy Narell.

"The Passage" – 10:13
"Song for Mia" - 8:05
"The Long Way Back" - 5:57
"Sea of Stories" - 9:17
"Mabouya" - 6:37
"Dee Mwa Wee" - 7:17
"Coffee Street" - 11:10

Personnel
Andy Narell - tenor, double second, and quaduet steel pans

Bandleaders
Mathieu Borgne - drums, percussion
Laurent Lalsingué - tenor, double second

Guest soloists
 Michael Brecker – tenor sax ("Song for Mia")
 Paquito D'Rivera – alto sax ("Mabouya")
 Hugh Masekela – flugelhorn ("Dee Mwa Wee")

Other instrumentalists
 tenor: Olivier Wiren, Clement Bazin, Stéphanie N'Doye-Chevret, Sonia Descamps
 double tenor: Gwendel Wiren
 double second: Laurence Guerrini, Traci-Leigh Scarlett, Melodie Hammel, Etienne Huguenot, Delphine Denis, Marie Pelletier, Alice Courbrant
 triple guitar: Julie Goldstein, Magda Belaïd
 double guitar: Coline Hammel, Thomas Calavera
 4 cello: Patrick Thine, Frédéric Deshuis, Agathe Delaporte, Donald Gellez
 tenor bass: Olivier Thomas, Jocelyne Baillon
 bass: José Babeu, Philippe Goldstein, Isabel Encinias, Nathalie Clérault, Smaïl-Smao Mekki, Bruno François
 percussion: Laurent Coatalen, Pernell Saturnino, Philippe Malique
 tuner: Darren Dyke

References

Andy Narell albums
2004 albums